The Yunnan lake newt (Cynops wolterstorffi) is an extinct species of newt in the family Salamandridae, and was also known as Wolterstorff's newt. It was only found near the Kunming Lake in Yunnan, China. It was found in shallow lake waters and adjacent freshwater habitats. Despite extensive surveys, it has not been seen since 1979, and is therefore considered extinct. The reasons for its extinction are believed to be habitat loss, pollution, and introduced species.

Etymology
The specific name wolterstorffi honours Willy Wolterstorff, German geologist and herpetologist.

References

Cynops
Amphibians of China
Endemic fauna of Yunnan
Extinct animals of China
Extinct amphibians
Amphibian extinctions since 1500
Amphibians described in 1905
Taxa named by George Albert Boulenger
Taxonomy articles created by Polbot